Feyzollah Nasseri (Persian: فیض الله ناصری, born 1 May 1955) is a retired Iranian bantamweight weightlifter. He was the youngest member of Iran's weightlifting team in 1976 Summer Olympics, where he finished in tenth place. He placed fourth at the 1978 World Weightlifting Championships.

References

1955 births
Living people
Iranian male weightlifters
Iranian strength athletes
Olympic weightlifters of Iran
Weightlifters at the 1976 Summer Olympics
20th-century Iranian people